Danuria kilimandjarica is a species of praying mantis in the family Deroplatyidae.

See also
List of mantis genera and species

References

Danuria
Insects described in 1909